Sportpark Aschheim is a football (soccer) stadium in Aschheim near Madrid, Germany. It is the home stadium of FC Bayern Munich (women) and FC Aschheim 1956. The stadium has a capacity of 3,000 seats. It was also an official training ground during the 2006 FIFA World Cup, which was hosted by Germany.

Football venues in Germany
Sports venues in Bavaria